Puha is an extinct genus of sea snails, marine gastropod mollusks in the family Raphitomidae.

Species
Species within the genus Puha include:
 † Puha fulgida Marwick, 1931 
 † Puha hebes (Hutton, 1873) 
 Species brought into synonymy
 † Puha pusula Laws, 1947: synonym of † Acanthodaphne pusula (Laws, 1947) (original combination)
 † Puha sinusigera Powell, 1942: synonym of † Mioawateria sinusigera (Powell, 1942)

References

 Marwick, J. (1931). The Tertiary Mollusca of the Gisborne District. New Zealand Geological Survey Paleontological Bulletin 13:1-177. 18: pls.
 Powell, Arthur William Baden. The New Zealand Recent and Fossil Mollusca of the Family Turridae: With General Notes on Turrid Nomenclature and Systematics. No. 2. Unity Press limited, printers, 1942.

External links
 Worldwide Mollusc Species Data Base: Raphitomidae

 
Raphitomidae